The Croatia national handball team represents Croatia in international men's team handball competitions and friendly matches. The handball team is controlled by the Croatian Handball Federation (HRS).

Croatia has often been portrayed as an international force in handball, having won two Olympic gold medals and one World Championship, but never winning the Euros, having lost three finals, one to rivals France, one to Denmark, and one to Spain. The Croatian national team that won the 1996 Olympic gold medal was often credited as the biggest upset in history of handball, with handball making its debut appearance. The Croatian national team won a so-called "international double" after winning both the gold medal at the Olympics (2004) and the World Championship (2003), beating Germany in both finals.

Croatia's handball team has often been labelled as a model for sport, often being the replacement for Romania in Europe's "Big three" in handball, alongside France and Denmark. Some of their biggest rivals are neighbours Slovenia, Hungary and Serbia. Germany are also called rivals of the handball team, although matches between Germany and Croatia have been met with Croatian dominance, Germany only winning once in their nine meetings, and Croatia winning seven times. Mediterranean side Spain have also been called as close rivals, having played 23 games with them, the most out of any sides the Croatians have played within handball. However, the French are often remarked as Croatia's biggest-ever rival in handball, due to both countries' successes. In recent history though, Croatia often suffered eliminations at the hands of the French.

History

Handball in Austria-Hungary (1904–1918)
The word handball in the Croatian region was first used by Franjo Bučar, describing the German game Schleuderball in the journal Sokol 1904. The earliest documented forms of playing handball in these areas appear in 1911 in the gymnasium of Pazin, which is among other things due to the fact that programs for education in Istria, as part of the then Austrian coast, coming from the education center in Graz. In Croatia, at the time handball was in high school programs closing ceremony. It was a kind of Czech handball extended from the Czech Republic, where it was adopted by the Osijek and Vukovar students from Prague.

Between the two world wars (1918–1941)
In the early beginnings of the Croatian handball, venues played field handball and handball. Students were still more attracted to field handball, because the little handball were played on makeshift courts without the right door, as opposed to the field handball, which is played on the existing football fields. During the Kingdom of Yugoslavia first public handball match in the Croatian region was played and in the wider neighborhood. It was played in a high school in Varaždin 29 May 1930 under the guidance of physical education teachers Zvonimir Šuligoj. Since that game, until 1950, in Croatia and Yugoslavia publicly played exclusively field handball, on the football field with eleven players on each side. In high school in Zagreb on 1 June 1935, opened the first handball courts in Yugoslavia.

The establishment of Croatian Handball Federation and the first Croatian national team (1941–1945)
At the beginning of World War II Kingdom of Yugoslavia disintegrated. Most of the territory inhabited by Croats on 10 April 1941, it became part of the newly formed Independent State of Croatia (NDH). As part of the new state on 2 October 1941 in Zagreb for the first time in history the Croatian Handball Federation (HRS) was established.
The place of foundation is recorded to be at the Croatian Sports home in Jurišićeva, Zagreb. HRS is the umbrella organization of handball in the ISC coordinated the work of a dozen clubs and until 1944 organized national championships. In the state of NDH was established the first Croatian handball team. The first training for practice-match team NDH was held on 12 October 1941 between the two teams selected from the head coach Dragutin Pehe. His first and only international match this team played on 14 June 1942 with Hungary in Budapest where they lost 0:9. This field handball match was played in front of 30,000 spectators at the then NEP Stadium (since 2002 Ferenc Puskás Stadium) was a prelude meeting of the football teams of the same name. The best handball player in the field was the goalkeeper Branko Kralj. Under the direction of the coach Ante Škrtić, the players for Croatia were Vlado Abramović, Irislav Dolenec, Žarko Galetović, Zvonko Leskovar, Todor Marinov, Viktor Medved, Krešo Pavlin, Vlado Šimanović Stjepan Širić, Josip Žitnik and reserve goalkeeper Zdenko Šurina. HRS stopped functioning in 1944 because of the war in World War II.

Handball in SFR Yugoslavia (1945–1991)
Yugoslavia national handball team
When the 1945 World War II ended, the territory of the Independent State of Croatia was included in the newly established SFR Yugoslavia.

Immediately after that began the reconstruction of the war abandoned handball in Yugoslavia, and that same year founded the Committee for handball Gymnastics Association Croatian, and in May 1948 the Committee for handball Gymnastics Association of Yugoslavia. Operation HRS is restored on 19 December 1948, in which he, in accordance with the national policy of the new Yugoslav state, name changed in the Croatian Handball Association (RSH). Handball Federation of Yugoslavia (RSJ) was established on 17 December 1949 in Belgrade by pooling national and provincial associations, and it became a member of the International Handball Federation (IHF) in 1950.

After the end of World War II, most field handball players of NDH completed courses and became instructors or referees in handball. Some of them have become members of the field handball national team of Yugoslavia and played in its first international match, played on 19 June 1950 at the stadium in Stadion Kranjčevićeva in Zagreb, against Belgium. Yugoslavia won 18:3 playing with nine players from Zagreb, one from Split and one from Sarajevo.

Since the end of World War II until the breakup of Yugoslavia in 1991, the best Croatian handball players in field and team handball played for the national team of Yugoslavia. With this national team Croatians have performed at 17 major competitions and won seven medals. These are two Olympic gold medals, the Olympic bronze, world gold, world silver and two bronze world. Among the other famous trophy, in this period they won 5 gold medals in five appearances at the Mediterranean Games (1967, 1975, 1979, 1983 and 1991), two gold and one bronze medal at the World Cups held in 1971, 1974 and 1984 in Sweden, 2 bronze medals at handball Super League held in 1981 and 1983 in Germany and silver at the 1990 goodwill Games in Seattle.

At the World Junior Championship in 1987 in Rijeka there was created a nucleus generation that will define the nineties and bring some of the most beautiful handball stories for the Croatian national team. Alvaro Načinović, Iztok Puc, Vladimir Jelčić and other predominantly have won this championship playing for Yugoslavia, and their talent and knowledge are later incorporated as seniors in the first Croatian success after independence of the country.

Modern Croatia national handball team (1991–present)

Official formation and first competitions (1991–1996)
Croatia on 30 May 1990 began the process of creating the independent state, and soon established and modern Croatian handball team. The first international match of the Croatian handball team was played on 14 January 1991 in Zagreb, in Kutija Šibica. It was a friendly match with Japan which ended in a draw 23:23. The team was coached by Josip Milković with assistant coach Lino Červar and the players were Patrik Čavar, Tonči Peribonio, Vlado Šola, Ivica Obrvan, Nenad Kljaić, Iztok Puc, Ratko Tomljanović, Bruno Gudelj, Željko Zovko, Stjepan Obran, Tomislav Farkaš, Robert Ipša, Ivo Glavinić and Goran Stojanović.
The dissolution of Yugoslavia that followed, Croatia gained full independence on 8 October 1991 the Croatian Handball Association (RSH) in 1992 restored the original name of the Croatian Handball Federation (HRS), and on 10 April 1992 became a member of the International Handball Federation (IHF), and 23 July 1992 members of the European Handball Federation (EHF).

Taking fourth place at the 1990 World Championship in Czechoslovakia the Yugoslav national team was placed among the nine best teams of the tournament, which acquired them the right to participate in the upcoming 1992 Olympic Games in Barcelona. Because of the war and the disintegration of Yugoslavia, this team was disqualified, and should it was supposed to be specified who will replaced them in the games. Since the Croatian Olympic Committee (COC) was provisionally recognized on 17 January 1992 by the International Olympic Committee (IOC), and since Croatia had already on 22 May 1992 become a member of the United Nations, Croatian handball players had conditions to perform at the Olympic Games in 1992. This unfortunately did not happen. Although Croatia in terms of game was handball superpower, it was decided that Yugoslavia would be replaced by Iceland at the games as they finished tenth at the 1990 World Championship. Adverse effects of certain officials in the IOC prevented even the option of maintaining an additional qualifying tournament like the one held for the Croatian basketball players. Croatia also missed the 1993 World Championship in Sweden, because the World Championship in 1990 was an elimination tournament for this championship.

The following years, in spite of the short history of the country brought the Croatian team very significant results in important competitions. Croatia won its first official competition at the Mediterranean Games in 1993 in Languedoc-Roussillon, France, Croatia won gold. At the first ever European Championship in 1994 held in Portugal the team was led by Zdravko Zovko they won their first medal at this first major international competition. The group stage ended with Croatia finishing behind then powerful Russians, but in front of the French, led by the famous Jackson Richardson. In the semi-finals, the Swedes were better and Croatia played the third place match and won in a dramatic match against Denmark. Sweden won the tournament demolishing the Russians in the final with 13 points. A year later at the 1995 World Championships in Iceland Croatia relatively went easily from group stage to the quarter final where there was brought a rarely seen drama. Tunisia was defeated after penalty shootout. Then the team beat Egypt in the quarter finals and Sweden men's national handball team in the semi-finals. In the final they the French were too big an obstacle for Zovko guys won their first Croatian World Championship silver medal. Sweden won the bronze defeating Germany. The next year at the European Championship in 1996 in Spain, Croatia, was led by Abas Arslanagić. Croatia lost took fifth place with victory over the Czech Republic where the match was led by Vladimir Nekić because Arslanagić quit after Croatia failed to enter the semi-finals. The championship was won by Russia.

  Bronze medal at European Championship 1994 in Portugal
  Silver medal at World Championship 1995 in Iceland
 Fifth place at European Championship 1996 in Spain

Gold medal at the 1996 Summer Olympics
On the second Olympics in which Croatian athletes performed under the banner of the Croatian flag and won their first gold medal. This was won by the athletes who were least expected to win it, handball players. They were sent off to Atlanta without hope, because at the European Championship in 1996 they had finished in a weak fifth place, and relations in the national team were bad. Coach Abas Arslanagić quit during the end of the European championship and the national handball selection was filled with confrontation and fights.  38 days before the Olympic Games, the team was taken over by coach Velimir Kljaić, whose statement: "Will go back swimming if we don't win a medal" no one took seriously.

Before the Olympics there were still problems. Preliminary matches didn't offer much optimism. A few days before the start of the handball tournament a friendly encounter with Algeria was not played to the end. The Croatian players left the court because the Algerians went too far with their abusive playing and hurt three players, Goran Perkovac, Slavko Goluža and Nenad Kljaić.

The opening match of the Olympic games against Switzerland was tough. A victory was achieved in an already lost match. The Swiss led by as much as 6 goals, but then the goal was kept safe with a superb save from Venio Losert who just during the Olympic Games celebrated his 20th birthday. Making it a minimal victory, scoring in the 55th second before the end of the match, Patrik Ćavar brought a stellar victory.

The next two matches against Kuwait and hosts United States were easy victories. This was followed by the decisive encounter to enter the semi-finals, where there were only the two first-placed teams from each group.

The match with the then current Olympic and European champions Russia had a shocking finale. The Russians were leading by four points, but the Croats were arriving. The last minute was not for the faint of heart, but from the Russian roulette though the Croats came out as winners. One her of this triumph for the semi-finals was Valter Matošević. 40 seconds before the end of the match, when the result was 24:24, he defended a penalty shot from Torgovanov. Another hero was Božidar Jović, who just 3 seconds before the siren rang scored the winning goal.

The last match in the group was with the Swedes. This was the one in which yoneou could choose an opponent in the semi-finals, but Kljun omitted Patrik Ćavar, Iztok Puc, Zlatko Saračević and Irfan Smajlagić from the match. Croatia was defeated with nine goals difference, but without their poker aces there wasn't much to expect. The defeat did not have larger significance, except that it took to save face. In the semi-finals they waited for the French who were World Champions. Croatian handball showed the best possible way to respond to defeat in the final of the 1995 World Championship in Iceland. Engaged and disciplined, Croatian players did a great job and ensured the silver medal the same brightness as did the water polo team.

In the grand finale again Croatia faced the Swedes. In the semi-finals they defeated Spain, who later won the bronze medal. It was a great generation that only needed an Olympic gold medal to complete their collection. They probably hoped that Croatia was not with those who were missing against Sweden would not much raise the quality that they could be threatened. In the end their plans were foiled, and the Vikings failed to win. After starting 0: 1 followed by a brilliant game from the players Kljaić chose and the series of 6:1. The defense was solid and impenetrable and the attack varied and deadly. Perkovac great led his boys and Božidar Jović was the revelation of the tournament. Worried only in the final Zlatko Saračević was not playing properly, but Kljaić brought the perfect replacement, Zoran Mikulić. Although the Croatians twice led with seven goals difference, the second half offered drama. Swedes switched to defense 4–2 which created big problems. Decreased the difference and 6:30 minutes before the end came at just hit behind. Croatian handball players still in those crucial minutes they had never trembled hands.

Thirty seconds before the end of the line player Nenad Kljaić scored a crucial goal for the final 27:26 and brought a glorious victory. With the sound of sirens was created indescribable celebration and parquet Georgia Dome in front of 25,000 visitors in the hall and millions of TV viewers, which is today known caterpillar gold handball. It was the biggest win in the history of Croatian sport. The handball players were not yet aware of this gold they had placed around his neck President of the Croatian Olympic Committee Antun Vrdoljak, who previously predicted 6 Atlanta medal and otherwise announced "As running from the day he was born" at Zagreb's main square. Still not running, but the handball players after returning from Atlanta to thousands of fans being greeted at the airport and on Jelačić Square. And they did the famous caterpillar crawl.

A series of poor results (1996–2002)
After winning the Olympic gold medal on 4 August 1996 it was followed by a slow decline in the Croatian national team and the change of generations in which the handball players were far from winning a medal. It started when Croatia was knocked-out in the round of 16 of the World Championships. In Japan in 1997, Croatia was knocked out by Spain 31:25 and was ranked in 13th place. In Egypt 1999 they were knocked-out by Yugoslavia 30:23 leaving Croatia in 10th place. In France 2001 the national team would lose in the next round after two extra time (4 × 5 minutes) stopped Ukraine 37:34 (29: 29/33: 33) finishing in 9th place. At the European Championships in 1998, 2000 and 2002 finished in 8th, 6th and 16th place. Croatia in 2000 hosted the European Championship, they had high expectations from this tournament but they weren't fulfilled. After the defeat from Slovenia in the match for fifth place Croatia took only 6th place and failed to qualify for the 2000 Olympic Games in Sydney. The national team is also lost its ability to defend the gold from Atlanta in Sydney.

First Červar era (2002–2010)
Once the team reached bottom with their results, being ranked last or in 16th place at the 2002 European Championship, in March 2002 the Federation entrusted Lino Červar and with him the team that suffered a seven-year drought medal in two years was created into the world champions and Olympic winners. In the period between these two gold medals Croatia is still ranked 4th place at the European Championships in 2004 in Slovenia. With Červar in charge Croatia would be at the top of the handball world.

With the arrival of Lino Červar and a maturing exceptionally talented new generation including a young Ivano Balić, the revival of the national team culminated at the 2003 World Championship. The start of the competition was disastrous. Croatia lost in their first match to Argentina who was at the time a punching for serious national teams in official competitions. Although the first half led with 5 goals, but 14 minutes before the end of the match conceded 6 goals. At the end of the match, Croatian handball players fired five successive attacks, and Mirza Džomba 20 seconds before the end missed the equalizer. How Croatian players badly played that match was proven by the fact they missed 6 penalty shots. During halftime of the second match against another underdog Saudi Arabia Croatia was losing with 2 differences and was playing desperately. Yet the team found strength to win this match. The turning point was marvelous – the group's dramatic victories in the end against giants Russia, France and Hungary securing first place to the second part where the Croats were convincing against Egypt and Denmark. In semi-finals the match went into overtime (4 × 5 minutes) defeating the Spaniards 39:37 (26: 26/31: 31) and in the grand final they outscored Germany 34:31 and won their first title of world champions and wrote surely one of the most beautiful story's in the history of Croatian sport.

In January 2004 Croatia played at the 2004 European Championship in Slovenia. They got to the semi-finals where they were knocked out by the hosts 25:27. They finished in fourth place losing the third place match to Denmark 27:31.

In Summer 2004 the Olympics were held in Athens. The national team continued its dominating play and were undefeated in all eight matches played. They defeated Iceland, Slovenia, South Korea, Russia, Spain, Greece and Hungary before getting to the final. In a dramatic final Croatia defeated Germany 26–24 and with the title of world champions they won the Olympic gold. In the last 5 minutes of the match went a goal ahead for Croatia, and then Nikša Kaleb who had not scored no goal with 3 consecutive goals sealed a great victory. The gold was an even greater success considering the fact that Croatia traveled to Athens without their best line player Renato Sulić who was recovering from a car accident, without important defense player Tonči Valčić and without Patrik Ćavar who was ill.

Rivalries
Croatia has developed several handball rivalries. Their most played rivalry is against France, which is often considered to be one of the biggest modern handball rivalries since the end of the Cold War, since Croatia, Denmark, Spain and France are the most successful nations in handball both in Europe and worldwide. Their second biggest rivalry is with neighbors Slovenia, whom they played 14 times, winning 9 games and losing 5. In recent years, a rivalry with Spain has also developed, sometimes called the Mediterranean derby. Other rivalries include Denmark, Poland, Germany, Serbia and Hungary.

The 2009 World Men's Handball Championship, hosted in Croatia, was remembered in Croatia for constant refereeing mistakes, through which France ultimately won the final against Croatia. The final was memorable for starting the "curse of Arena Zagreb", in which many Croatian sports teams had lost finals in the Arena. Many had questioned the appointment of Danish referee Olesen Pedersen, who was remarked for his constant mistakes against several Croatian handball players, through which France won the final. After the final, the rivalry sparked more in Croatia, but later became a famous French phenomenon.

Results at international competitions
Croatian national handball team results
Prior to 1991, Croatia men's national handball team played as a part of Yugoslavia men's national handball team.

Croatia played its first match on 14 January 1991 in Zagreb. Team's first opponent was Japan and the match ended tied 23–23.

Overview of achievements at major international competitions

Medal count (major competitions)
Updated after 2021 World Handball Championship

 Champions   Runners-up   Third place   Fourth place

Competitive record (major competitions)

Summer Olympics

Competitive record at the Summer Olympics

Competitive record in qualifying rounds

World Championship

Competitive record at the World Championship

Competitive record in qualifying rounds
{| class="wikitable" style="text-align: center;"
|-
!Year
!width="15"|
!width="15"|
!width="15"|
!width="15"|
!
!
!
!
|-
| 1993||colspan="7" | Couldn't qualify||N/A
|- style="background:#ccffcc;"
| 1995||colspan="7" | 3rd at the 1994 Euro||yes
|- style="background:#ccffcc;"
| 1997||colspan="7" | 5th at the 1996 Euro||yes
|- style="background:#ccffcc;"
| 1999||6||5||0||1||171||152||+19||yes
|- style="background:#ccffcc;"
| 2001||colspan="7" | 6th at the 2000 Euro||yes
|- style="background:#ccffcc;"
| 2003||2||2||0||0||67||50||+17||yes
|- style="background:#ccffcc;"
| 2005||colspan="7" | defending champion||yes
|- style="background:#ccffcc;"
| 2007||colspan="7" | 4th at the 2006 Euro||yes
|- style="background:#ccffcc;"
|style="border: 3px solid red"| 2009||colspan="7" | Qualified as host||yes
|- style="background:#ccffcc;"
| 2011||colspan="7" | 2nd at the 2010 Euro||yes
|- style="background:#ccffcc;"
| 2013||colspan="7" | 3rd at the 2012 Euro||yes
|- style="background:#ccffcc;"
| 2015||colspan="7" | 4th at the 2014 Euro||yes
|- style="background:#ccffcc;"
| 2017||colspan="7" | 3rd at the 2016 Euro||yes
|- style="background:#ccffcc;"
| 2019||2||1||0||1||63||51||+12||yes
|- style="background:#ccffcc;"
| 2021||colspan="7" | Top four at the 2020 Euro||yes
|- style="background:#ccffcc;"
| 2023||2||2||0||0||70||43||+27||yes|- style="background:#ccffcc;"
|style="border: 3px solid red"| 2025||colspan="7" | Qualified as co-host||yes|-
| 2027||colspan="8" | To be determined
|-
!Total!!12!!105!!0!!2!!371!!296!!+75!!4/4
|}

European Championship
Competitive record at the European Championship

Competitive record in qualifying rounds

Mediterranean Games

Team
Current squad
Squad for the 2023 World Men's Handball Championship.

Head coach: Hrvoje Horvat

Coaching staff

Head coaches
  Josip Milković (1990–1991)
  Zdravko Zovko (1991–1995)
  Abas Arslanagić (1995–1996)
  Vlado Nekić (1996; Acting) 
  Velimir Kljaić (1996)
  Ivan Duvnjak (1996; Acting) 
  Damir Čavlović (1996; Acting) 
  Josip Glavaš (1997) 
  Ilija Puljević (1997–1998)
  Velimir Kljaić (1998–1999)
  Zdravko Zovko (1999–2000)
  Josip Milković (2000–2002)
  Lino Červar (2002–2010)
  Irfan Smajlagić (2003, 2004, and 2005; Acting)
  Slavko Goluža (2010–2015)
  Željko Babić (2015–2017)
  Lino Červar (2017–2021)
  Hrvoje Horvat (2021–2023)
  Goran Perkovac (2023–)

Captains
  Alvaro Načinović (1992–1996)
  Goran Perkovac (1996–1998)
  Patrik Ćavar (1998–1999)
  Slavko Goluža (1999–2006)
  Petar Metličić (2006–2009)
  Igor Vori (2009–2015)
  Marko Kopljar (2015–2016)
  Domagoj Duvnjak (2017–present)

Squads
Major tournaments

Minor tournaments

Medal-winning squads
 Gold medal at the 1993 Mediterranean Games: Tonči Peribonio, Mirko Bašić, Goran Perkovac, Alvaro Načinović, Ivica Obrvan, Bruno Gudelj, Iztok Puc, Zlatko Saračević, Ratko Tomljanović, Vlado Šola, Vladimir Jelčić, Patrik Ćavar, Irfan Smajlagić, Nenad Kljaić
 coach: Zdravko Zovko
 Bronze medal at the 1994 European Championship: Zvonimir Bilić, Patrik Ćavar, Darko Franović, Slavko Goluža, Bruno Gudelj, Vladimir Jelčić, Nenad Kljaić, Valter Matošević, Alvaro Načinović, Ivica Obrvan, Tonči Peribonio, Goran Perkovac, Iztok Puc, Zlatko Saračević, Irfan Smajlagić, Vlado Šola, Ratko Tomljanović
 coach: Zdravko Zovko
 Silver medal at the 1995 World Championship: Goran Perkovac, Irfan Smajlagić, Alvaro Načinović, Iztok Puc, Zlatko Saračević, Patrik Ćavar, Ratko Tomljanović, Vlado Šola, Valter Matošević, Zvonimir Bilić, Slavko Goluža, Božidar Jović, Venio Losert, Boris Jarak, Tomislav Farkaš, Mirza Šarić
 coach: Zdravko Zovko
 Gold medal at the 1996 Olympics: Patrik Ćavar, Valner Franković, Slavko Goluža, Bruno Gudelj, Vladimir Jelčić, Božidar Jović, Nenad Kljaić, Venio Losert, Valter Matošević, Zoran Mikulić, Alvaro Načinović, Goran Perkovac, Iztok Puc, Zlatko Saračević, Irfan Smajlagić, Vladimir Šujster
 coach: Velimir Kljaić
 Gold medal at the 1997 Mediterranean Games: Goran Perkovac, Valter Matošević, Valner Franković, Božidar Jović, Miro Barišić, Mario Bjeliš, Goran Jerković, Mirza Džomba, Enes Halkić, Davor Dominiković, Silvio Ivandija, Igor Kos, Dragan Jerković, Neno Boban, Mario Kelentrić, Mladen Prskalo
 coach: Velimir Kljaić
 Gold medal at the 2001 Mediterranean Games: Ivano Balić, Tihomir Baltić, Zvonimir Bilić, Davor Dominiković, Mirza Džomba, Slavko Goluža, Božidar Jović, Mario Kelentrić, Igor Kos, Blaženko Lacković, Valter Matošević, Diego Modrušan, Goran Šprem, Renato Sulić, Vedran Zrnić
 coach: Josip Milković
 Gold medal at the 2003 World Championship: Ivano Balić, Davor Dominiković, Mirza Džomba, Slavko Goluža, Božidar Jović, Nikša Kaleb, Mario Kelentrić, Blaženko Lacković, Valter Matošević, Petar Metličić, Vlado Šola, Denis Špoljarić, Goran Šprem, Renato Sulić, Tonči Valčić, Igor Vori, Vedran Zrnić
 coach: Lino Červar
 Gold medal at the 2004 Olympics: Ivano Balić, Davor Dominiković, Mirza Džomba, Slavko Goluža, Nikša Kaleb, Blaženko Lacković, Venio Losert, Valter Matošević, Petar Metličić, Vlado Šola, Denis Špoljarić, Goran Šprem, Igor Vori, Drago Vuković, Vedran Zrnić
 coach: Lino Červar
 Silver medal at the 2005 World Championship: Venio Losert, Nikša Kaleb, Ivano Balić, Blaženko Lacković, Vedran Zrnić, Igor Vori, Davor Dominiković, Mirza Džomba, Vlado Šola, Zoran Jeftić, Slavko Goluža, Nikola Blažičko, Goran Šprem, Denis Špoljarić, Petar Metličić, Denis Buntić
 coach: Lino Červar
 Silver medal at the 2005 Mediterranean Games: Damir Bičanić, Nikola Blažičko, Denis Buntić, Josip Čale, Ivan Čupić, Zlatko Horvat, Tomislav Huljina, Krešimir Ivanković, Marin Knez, Branimir Koloper, Mario Obad, Vladimir Ostarčević, Ivan Pongračić, Vjenceslav Somić, Ljubo Vukić, Drago Vuković
 coach: Lino Červar
 Silver medal at the 2008 European Championship: Nikša Kaleb, Renato Sulić, Ivano Balić, Domagoj Duvnjak, Blaženko Lacković, Igor Vori, Davor Dominiković, Vjenceslav Somić, Zlatko Horvat, Drago Vuković, Dragan Jerković, Denis Špoljarić, Petar Metličić, Josip Valčić, Ljubo Vukić, Tonči Valčić, Mirko Alilović, Ivan Čupić
 coach: Lino Červar
 Silver medal at the 2009 World Championship: Venio Losert, Mateo Hrvatin, Ivano Balić, Domagoj Duvnjak, Blaženko Lacković, Vedran Zrnić, Marko Kopljar, Igor Vori, Jakov Gojun, Zlatko Horvat, Ivan Pešić, Goran Šprem, Denis Špoljarić, Petar Metličić, Denis Buntić, Josip Valčić, Tonči Valčić, Mirko Alilović, Ivan Čupić, Dalibor Anušić, Ivan Ninčević
 coach: Lino Červar
 Silver medal at the 2010 European Championship: Ivano Balić, Domagoj Duvnjak, Blaženko Lacković, Vedran Zrnić, Marko Kopljar, Igor Vori, Jakov Gojun, Goran Čarapina, Drago Vuković, Vedran Mataija, Damir Bičanić, Denis Buntić, Tonči Valčić, Mirko Alilović, Manuel Štrlek, Ivan Čupić, Željko Musa, Luka Raković.
 coach: Lino Červar
 Bronze medal at the 2012 European Championship: Ivano Balić, Domagoj Duvnjak, Blaženko Lacković, Marko Kopljar, Igor Vori, Jakov Gojun, Venio Losert, Zlatko Horvat, Drago Vuković, Damir Bičanić, Denis Buntić, Mirko Alilović, Manuel Štrlek, Ivan Čupić, Željko Musa, Ivan Ninčević
 coach: Slavko Goluža
 Bronze medal at the 2012 Olympics: Venio Losert, Ivano Balić, Domagoj Duvnjak, Blaženko Lacković, Marko Kopljar, Igor Vori, Jakov Gojun, Zlatko Horvat, Drago Vuković, Damir Bičanić, Denis Buntić, Mirko Alilović, Manuel Štrlek, Ivan Čupić, Ivan Ninčević
 coach: Slavko Goluža
 Bronze medal at the 2013 World Championship: Mirko Alilović, Filip Ivić, Ivan Čupić, Zlatko Horvat, Manuel Štrlek, Lovro Šprem, Marko Kopljar, Luka Stepančić, Domagoj Duvnjak, Jakov Gojun, Damir Bičanić, Drago Vuković, Stipe Mandalinić, Blaženko Lacković, Igor Vori, Marino Marić, Ivan Ninčević
 coach: Slavko Goluža
 Silver medal at the 2013 Mediterranean Games: Ivan Pešić, Ivan Stevanović, Hrvoje Batinović, Lovro Šprem, Jerko Matulić, Nik Dominik Tominec, Marino Marić, Filip Gavranović, Ivan Slišković, Stefan Vujić, Marko Matic, Luka Stepančić, Robert Markotić, Igor Karačić, Damir Batinović, Josip Vidović
 coach: Slavko Goluža
 Bronze medal at the 2016 European Championship:Ivan Stevanović, Marino Marić, Domagoj Duvnjak, Marko Kopljar, Jakov Gojun, Zlatko Horvat, Igor Karačić, Krešimir Kozina, Mirko Alilović, Manuel Štrlek, Ivan Čupić, Antonio Kovačević, Marko Mamić, Luka Šebetić, Ivan Slišković, Luka Cindrić, Ilija Brozović
 coach: Željko Babić
 Silver medal at the 2020 European Championship: Marino Marić, Domagoj Duvnjak, Matej Hrstić, Luka Stepančić, Zlatko Horvat, Josip Šarac, Igor Karačić, Željko Musa, Marko Mamić, Luka Cindrić, Ilija Brozović, Vlado Matanović, David Mandić, Valentino Ravnić, Marin Šipić, Marin Šego, Matej Ašanin
 coach: Lino Červar

Notable players
 Alvaro Načinović Franjo Bučar State Award for Sport: 1996
 Irfan Smajlagić part of the all-star team of the 1995 World Championship as the best right wing
 Best Croatian handballer of 1995 by CHF & SN
 part of the all-star team of the 1996 Olympic tournament as the best right wing
 Franjo Bučar State Award for Sport: 1996 and 2004
 Patrik Ćavar Best Croatian handballer of 1994, 1997 and 2000 by CHF & SN
 top scorer and part of the all-star team of the 1996 Olympic tournament as the best left wing
 Franjo Bučar State Award for Sport: 1996
Best % of goals scored for the national team – 5.33
2nd top goalscorer of the national team – 639 goals
 Ivano Balić IHF World Player of the Year 2003 and 2006
 Croatian Sportsman of the Year: 2007
 part of the all-star team of the 2004 Olympic tournament as the best central back
 MVP and part of the all-star team of the 2005 World Championship as the best central back
 top scorer and part of the all-star team of the 2006 European Championship as the best central back
 MVP of the 2007 World Championship
 top scorer and part of the all-star team of the 2008 European Championship as the best central back
 Mirza Džomba part of the all-star team of the 2003 World Championship as the best right wing
 MVP and top scorer of the 2004 European Championship
 part of the all-star team of the 2004 Olympic tournament as the best right wing
 Franjo Bučar State Award for Sport: 2004
 part of the all-star team of the 2005 World Championship as the best right wing
 Best Croatian handballer of 2005 by CHF & SN
Best right wing in the history by EHF
All-time goalscorer of the national team – 719 goals
 Valter Matošević2nd best goalkeeper at 1995 World Championship
 Best Croatian handballer of 1995 by CHF & SN
 Franjo Bučar State Award for Sport: 1996 and 2004
 Record in the national team for the number of saves in one match – 24
 Slavko Goluža Franjo Bučar State Award for Sport: 1996, 2004 and 2009
Best Croatian handball player by CHF & Sportske novosti: 2001
Trophy MOO for sports and promoting optimism: 2007

 Igor Vori best defence player of the 2008 European Championship
 MVP and part of the all-star team of the 2009 World Championship as the best pivot
 part of the all-star team of the 2010 European Championship as the best pivot
 Ivan Čupić part of the all-star team of the 2009 World Championship as the best right wing
 part of the all-star team of the 2012 Olympic tournament as the best right wing
 Blaženko Lacković part of the all-star team of the 2009 World Championship as the best left back
 Jakov Gojun best defence player of the 2010 European Championship
 Manuel Štrlek part of the all-star team of the 2010 European Championship as the best left wing
 part of the all-star team of the 2016 European Championship as the best left wing
 Vedran Zrnić part of the all-star team of the 2011 World Championship as the best right wing
 Marko Kopljar part of the all-star team of the 2012 European Championship as the best right back
 Domagoj Duvnjak IHF World Player of the Year 2013
 part of the all-star team of the 2013 World Championship as the best playmaker
 part of the all-star team of the 2014 European Championship as the best centre back
 part of the all-star team of the 2017 World Championship as the best centre back
 Venio Losert Franjo Bučar State Award for Sport: 1996 and 2004
 3rd best goalkeeper at 2004 Summer Olympics
 Davor Dominiković Franjo Bučar State Award for Sport: 2004
 Iztok Puc' Franjo Bučar State Award for Sport: 1996

Statistics

Most appearances

 

Top scorers
 Players that played for Croatian National Handball Team after the breakup of Yugoslavia andcollected 100+ caps combined for Yugoslavian and Croatian National Handball Teams.Record against other teamsAs of 20 March 2021 

Biggest winsDouble digit goal difference''

Biggest losses

Awards
The Croatia national handball team has received numerous award throughout the years.

Senior squad
Sportske novosti awards team of the year: 1995, 1996, 2003, 2004 and 2009
Franjo Bučar State Award for Sport: 1996 and 2004
Selection of the most successful athletes by COC male team: 2003, 2004, 2006, 2008 and 2009
Selection of the most successful athletes by COC for promoting Croatia: 2003, 2004 and 2012
Ivica Jobo Kurtini Award – 2004

U-19 squad
Dražen Petrović Award: 2007 and 2009

See also
Croatia women's national handball team
Croatia national beach handball team
Croatia women's national beach handball team

References

External links

IHF profile

Men's national handball teams
Handball in Croatia
Handball